Deer Island was a small place with only one family in the Bonavista, Newfoundland and Labrador, Canada, area circa 1864.  It had a population of 109 by 1940.

See also
 List of communities in Newfoundland and Labrador

Ghost towns in Newfoundland and Labrador